The Victim is a four-part Scottish thriller miniseries starring Kelly Macdonald, James Harkness, John Hannah and John Scougall. The series was produced by STV Studios and first broadcast on BBC One television in April 2019. The series was shot on location in Edinburgh, Glasgow, Port Glasgow and Largs.

Plot
Bereaved mother Anna Dean, whose young son was murdered by an older boy 14 years prior, goes on trial for inciting murder after she is accused of posting online the new identity and address of the man she believes murdered her son: Craig Myers. Myers, a husband and father, is violently beaten and feels he must restore his reputation. The series revolves around the trial of the case, alongside its consequences for Myers' family and Dean's search to unmask the true identity of her son's killer.

Cast
Kelly Macdonald as Anna Dean
James Harkness as Craig Myers
John Hannah as DI Stephen Grover
Karla Crome as Rebecca Myers
John Scougall as Tom Carpenter
Jamie Sives as Lenny Dean
Isis Hainsworth as Louise Graham
Andrew Rothney as Danny Callaghan
Pooky Quesnel as Mo Buckley
Chloe Pirrie as Ella Mackie
Joanne Thomson as DS Lisa Harvey
Ramon Tikaram as Solomon Mishra
Cal MacAninch as Christian Graham
Nicholas Nunn as William Napier
Tom Mannion as Gerry Tythe
Georgie Glen as Judge
Allison McKenzie as Cathy 
Zahar Burlakov as Ben Dean

Episodes

Production
In an interview with RadioTimes.com, screenwriter Rob Williams, who had previously volunteered to teach in prisons, said, “What has become really clear to me is that there is always a story behind every crime, from the seemingly trivial to the biggest crimes... We look for the black and the white, not least because the law demands black and white, it demands a goodie and a baddie and a villain and a hero. Life’s not like that, it seems to me and when you dig into the reasons behind crimes, all sorts of crimes, they’re always just far more nuanced and fascinating as a result of going beyond the surface”.

Broadcast
The series was first broadcast on BBC One at 9pm from Monday to Thursday, 8 to 11 April 2019.

Reception
The series has an 90% rating on Rotten Tomatoes. It was well received by critics, some of whom pointed to plot similarities with real life cases involving child murderers such as the murder of James Bulger.

References

External links

2010s British drama television series
2010s British television miniseries
2019 British television series debuts
2019 British television series endings
BBC television dramas
English-language television shows
Television series by STV Studios
Television shows set in Scotland